The Rewriteable Consumer Timecode (RCTC, RC Timecode, or RC Time Code) is a nearly frame accurate timecode method developed by Sony for 8mm and Hi8 analog tape formats. The RC timecode tags each frame with the hour, minute, second and frame for each frame of video recorded to tape.  Officially, RCTC is accurate to within ±2 to 5 frames. The RC timecode can be used in conjunction with the datacode to record the date and the time. The data and RC codes are written between the video and the PCM audio tracks. It may be added to any 8-mm tape without altering the information already on the tape, and is invisible to machines not equipped to read it.

On several video camera models, Sony included the ability to search by date/time (appropriately called Date Search) and to index positions within the tape so that the index mark could be returned to with the press of a button.

The RC timecode is a different technology than the SMPTE timecode, linear timecode (LTC), and vertical interval timecode (VITC).

At least one manufacturer (Octochron) created tools to capture the information from the RC timecode on tape and export it via Serial or USB to the computer.

A partial list of camcorders which supported RC timecode.

See also
Linear timecode (LTC)
Vertical interval timecode (VITC)
CTL timecode
MIDI timecode
AES-EBU embedded timecode

References

Timecodes
Film and video technology